Sophie Harley is a British jewellery designer. She is known for designs incorporating charms and a mixture of silver, gold and precious stones.

Background 
She obtained an MA in 'goldsmithing and jewellery design' from London's Royal College of Art in 1989.

Career 
In 2002 Harley was commissioned by DeBeers to create a brooch to be awarded to the trainer of the winning horse in the King George VI and Queen Elizabeth Diamond Day stakes at Royal Ascot by Queen Elizabeth II. She has produced jewellery for the James Bond films Casino Royale and Quantum of Solace. In 2013 Sophie Harley won 'UK Jewellery Designer of the Year'.

Collectors 
Clients include Kate Beckinsale, Naomi Campbell, Judi Dench, Colin Firth, Jerry Hall, and Joss Stone.

References 

Living people
English designers
British jewellery designers
Alumni of the Royal College of Art
Year of birth missing (living people)
Women jewellers